Jennifer A. White (born April 21, 1988) is an American politician who is a member of the Maryland House of Delegates for District 10 in Baltimore County, Maryland.

Career
White graduated from Michigan State University with a Bachelor of Arts degree with honors in political theory and constitutional democracy, and social relations and policy in 2010. She later attended the Johns Hopkins Bloomberg School of Public Health, where she earned a Master of Science degree in public health in 2012. White is a non-profit executive and health equity partnerships manager.

In 2017, White graduated from a training course hosted by Emerge Maryland, an organization created to prepare potential female Democratic candidates for public office. In 2022, she ran for the Maryland House of Delegates, running on a slate with Speaker of the Maryland House of Delegates Adrienne A. Jones, then-state delegate Benjamin Brooks, and management consultant N. Scott Phillips. She won the Democratic primary on July 19, receiving 19.2 percent of the vote.

In the legislature
White was sworn into the Maryland House of Delegates on January 11, 2023. She is a member of the House Health and Government Operations Committee.

Electoral history

References

External links
 

21st-century African-American women
21st-century African-American politicians
21st-century American politicians
21st-century American women politicians
African-American state legislators in Maryland
African-American women in politics
Democratic Party members of the Maryland House of Delegates
Johns Hopkins Bloomberg School of Public Health alumni
Living people
Michigan State University alumni
People from Detroit
Women state legislators in Maryland
1988 births